Eula Independent School District is a public school district located in northwestern Callahan County, Texas (USA). A small portion of the district extends into eastern Taylor County.

In 2009, the school district was rated "recognized" by the Texas Education Agency.

References

External links
Eula ISD

School districts in Callahan County, Texas
School districts in Taylor County, Texas
School districts in Abilene, Texas